Terrie Christine Stevens, also known as T. Christine Stevens, is an American mathematician whose research concerns topological groups, the history of mathematics, and mathematics education. She is also known as the co-founder of Project NExT, a mentorship program for recent doctorates in mathematics, which she directed from 1994 until 2009.

Education and career
Stevens graduated from Smith College in 1970, and completed her doctorate in 1978 at Harvard University under the supervision of Andrew M. Gleason. Her dissertation was Weakened Topologies for Lie Groups.

She held teaching positions at the University of Massachusetts Lowell, at Mount Holyoke College and at Arkansas State University before joining Saint Louis University, where for 25 years she was a professor of mathematics and computer science.

She was also a Congressional Science Fellow assisting congressman Theodore S. Weiss in 1984–1985, and was a program officer at the National Science Foundation in 1987–1989. After retiring from SLU, she became Associate Executive Director for Meetings and Professional Services of the American Mathematical Society.

Recognition
In 2004 Stevens won the Gung and Hu Award for
Distinguished Service to Mathematics of the Mathematical Association of America for her work on Project NExT.
In 2010 Stevens was awarded the Smith College Medal by her alma mater.
She has been a fellow of the American Association for the Advancement of Science since 2005,
and in 2012, she became one of the inaugural fellows of the American Mathematical Society. She was the 2015 winner of the Louise Hay Award of the Association for Women in Mathematics.

References

External links
Home page

Year of birth missing (living people)
Living people
20th-century American mathematicians
21st-century American mathematicians
American women mathematicians
Group theorists
Mathematics educators
American historians of mathematics
Smith College alumni
Harvard University alumni
University of Massachusetts Lowell faculty
Mount Holyoke College faculty
Arkansas State University faculty
Saint Louis University faculty
Saint Louis University mathematicians
Fellows of the American Association for the Advancement of Science
Fellows of the American Mathematical Society
20th-century women mathematicians
21st-century women mathematicians
20th-century American women
21st-century American women